Stuart Barton Babbage  (4 January 1916 – 16 November 2012) was an Anglican priest.

Babbage was educated at Auckland Grammar School, the University of Auckland and King's College London. He was ordained in 1940. His first post was as a curate at Havering-atte-Bower. Then he was a chaplain in the RAF from 1942 to 1946, having been ordained 17 December 1939, in Essex. Returning to Australia he became Dean of Sydney, serving from 1947 to 1953; and then Melbourne from 1953 until 1962.

Babbage also served in theological education for which he was awarded the Order of Australia as a part of the 1995 Queen's Birthday honours list. He lectured at Moore Theological College while he was Dean of Sydney, and served as principal of Ridley College (Melbourne) while he was Dean of Melbourne. He moved to the United States to become one of the founders of Gordon–Conwell Theological Seminary before returning once more to Australia to become master of New College at the University of New South Wales. At the same time he served as Registrar of the Australian College of Theology, from 1973-1991. 
Babbage received a Doctorate of Theology from King's College, London, England.

Family

Stuart Babbage was born in Auckland, New Zealand, the eldest of six, to Gordon Swaine and Florence (née' Rutherfurd) on 4 January 1916. His family tree has been traced back to Charles Babbage (1791–1871), an English Polymath credited with inventing the first computer. Babbage's grandfather, Charles Whitmore Babbage, took the family to New Zealand where Gordon Babbage was born. His uncle, Eden Herschel Babbage (1844–1924) was considered the "father of Roseville," of which Babbage Road in Roseville is named, and served as manager of the Bank of Australasia.

After a troubled youth, Babbage went on to earn a master's degree by the age of 20 before traveling to London, England to pursue his PhD in theology. His thesis was on the Puritan movement and he was ordained in December 1939 in the Anglican priesthood. While serving as a chaplain in Feltwell, Norfolk with the RAF, Babbage met and married RAF flight officer Rachel Elizabeth King in 1943. Together Stuart and Elizabeth had four children, Veronica, Malcolm, Christopher, and Timothy. The family, minus Veronica, traveled to Atlanta, Georgia, in 1963 leaving Melbourne, Australia to participate in the American Civil Rights Movement, befriending Reverend Martin Luther King Jr.  Babbage became a professor at Columbia Theological Seminary in Georgia at the invitation of J. McDowell Richards, then president of the college from 1932 to 1971. He served as vicar in an African-American church in Atlanta. Babbage's son, Christopher married an African-American LaNell Johnson and integrated the Episcopal Cathedral in Atlanta. Lisa Noel Babbage, granddaughter to Babbage, chronicled the interracial marriage of her parents in the biography 333 Miracles'.

Career 

Babbage considered himself an Anglican evangelist, welcoming the Reverend Billy Graham to Australia for the 1959 crusade as executive chairman of the Melbourne Billy Graham Crusade. After arriving in the US, Babbage worked with Martin Luther King in Georgia. Babbage along with other clergy integrated "white only" churches and public parks in the 1960s. It was always at the heart of Babbage to create a safe place for young people to learn and achieve. He started after school clubs for young black children in low income neighborhoods while teaching at Columbia School of Theology in Decatur, Georgia. Eventually, Babbage moved to Pennsylvania and Massachusetts to help found the multi-racial Gordon-Conwell Theological Seminary. He wrote seven books, including a biography Memoirs of a Loose Canon.

Babbage lectured throughout New South Wales on controversial topics at the time, including divorce, stating "It is the simplest thing in the world to take out an order for restitution of conjugal rights, and, on this being ignored, to secure a divorce on the grounds of desertion. This encourages divorce by collusion", citing instead with biblical prescriptions for life-long fidelity.

Babbage died in Sydney, New South Wales, on 16 November 2012, survived by eight grandchildren, 15 great-grandchildren and two great-great-grandchildren.

References

1916 births
People from Auckland
University of New Zealand alumni
Alumni of King's College London
Deans of Sydney
Deans of Melbourne
Members of the Order of Australia
2012 deaths
People educated at Auckland Grammar School
Academic staff of Moore Theological College
University and college founders
Gordon–Conwell Theological Seminary faculty
Seminary presidents
Royal Air Force chaplains
Royal Air Force personnel of World War II
World War II chaplains